Luis Calderón (born 2 June 1990) is a Colombian professional footballer who plays as defender for Deportivo Cali.

External links 
 

1990 births
Living people
Colombian footballers
Deportivo Cali footballers
Association football defenders
Footballers from Cali